The Local Government Commission is an independent statutory body established under the Local Government Act 2002 in New Zealand.

The Commission has three members who are appointed by the Minister of Local Government. Its main task is to make decisions on the structure of local government and on electoral arrangements for local authorities.

Members
Members since 1990:

See also
Territorial authorities of New Zealand
Local Government New Zealand

References

External links
Local Government Commission website.

Government of New Zealand
Local government in New Zealand
Local government commissions